God's Cop may refer to:
James Anderton, a former chief constable of the county of Greater Manchester, England, sometimes referred to as God's Cop
"God's Cop", a song by Happy Mondays from their 1990 album Pills 'n' Thrills and Bellyaches